Velika is a village in the municipality of Derventa, Bosnia and Herzegovina.

Demographics

1991
213 total
 ethnic Muslims - 207 (97,18%)
 ethnic Yugoslavs - 4 (1,88%)
 Croats - 1 (0,46%)
 Serb - 1 (0,46%)

References

Villages in Republika Srpska
Populated places in Derventa